This article is a summary of 1979 in Australian television.

Events
February - The Government approves the application for ATV0 to convert its transmission to the Channel 10 frequency.
11 February - A brand new Australian weekly current affairs program 60 Minutes premieres on Nine Network. Based on the American newsmagazine television program of the same name, it has a lack lustre beginning, but will soon rise to become one of the highest-rating programs in Australia.
27 February - Australian prime time black comedy/soap opera from Reg Grundy Productions Prisoner premieres on the 0-10 Network. It enjoys a large following both in Australia and around the world, particularly in the UK and parts of the US.
28 February - In Prisoner, there was the Franky Doyle riot, Meg Jackson’s husband Bill Jackson is stabbed.
April - The Special Broadcasting Service screens the first of a series of multi-language programs on ABC on Sunday mornings.
2 April - Australian actor Ron Blanchard and Alexander Bunyip the delightful character from the popular children's book The Monster That Ate Canberra by Michael Salmon present a brand new afternoon block for children called ARVO which also features programs such as Play School, Mr. Squiggle and Friends, Sesame Street, Basil Brush and The Famous Five.
24 April - American prime time soap opera Dallas premieres on The 0-10 Network.
1 May - During an escape with her girlfriend Doreen Anderson, Franky Doyle was shot. Her last words were “b***dy b*****ds’.
28 June - Australian drama series Patrol Boat debuts on ABC.
1 July - Commercial television stations now required to screen ‘C’ classified programming, aimed solely at children aged 6 to 13, every weekday between 4:00pm and 5:00pm. Early ‘C’ classified programs include Simon Townsend's Wonder World (0-10), Stax (Seven) and Shirl's Neighbourhood (Seven). Commercial stations are also required to screen a minimum of 30 minutes each weekday, prior to 4:00pm, of programming aimed at pre-school viewers.
9 July - Crawford Productions's brand new soap opera Skyways begins it premiere on the Seven Network.
13 August - A brand new Australian environmental education series for children called Earthwatch debuts on ABC at 5:00pm as part of the ARVO lineup.
2 October - American sitcom Diff'rent Strokes debuts on Nine Network.
November - Media mogul Rupert Murdoch is taking control of TEN-10 Sydney and his bid to take over the Australian airline company which owns ATV0 Melbourne Ansett Australia, sparks a review into media ownership by the Australian Broadcasting Tribunal.
5 December - American sitcom Taxi premieres on Nine Network.

Debuts

New International Programming
7 January –  The Kenny Everett Video Show (ABC)
7 January –  All Creatures Great and Small (ABC)
8 January/7 May –  Michael Bentine's Potty Time (8 January: Seven Network - Melbourne, 7 May: Seven Network - Sydney)
11 January/4 September –  CHiPS (11 January: Seven Network - Melbourne, 4 September: Seven Network - Sydney)
13 January –  Baggy Pants and the Nitwits (The 0-10 Network)
21 January –  The Governor (ABC)
24 January –  Bagpuss (ABC)
1 February –  Rumpole of the Bailey (ABC)
10 February/19 February –  Mickey's 50 (10 February: Seven Network - Melbourne, 19 February: Nine Network - Sydney)
11 February –  Vega$ (Nine Network)
15 February –  The Incredible Hulk (1978) (Seven Network)
19 February –  Mork and Mindy (Nine Network)
5 March –  Battle of the Planets (The 0-10 Network)
10 March –  The Mumbly Cartoon Show (Nine Network)
21 March –  Peark (The 0-10 Network)
24 March –  The Secret Lives of Waldo Kitty (The 0-10 Network)
24 March –  I Am the Greatest: The Adventures of Muhammad Ali (The 0-10 Network)
2 April –  The Eagle of the Ninth (ABC)
19 April –  Sword of Justice (The 0-10 Network)
24 April –  Dallas (The 0-10 Network)
27 April –  Blake's 7 (ABC)
8 May –  Noah and Nelly in... SkylArk (ABC)
22 May –  The Famous Five (1978) (ABC)
28 May –  Roots: The Next Generations (The 0-10 Network)
31 May –  Project U.F.O. (The 0-10 Network)
4 June –  Danger UXB (ABC)
12 June –  Lillie (Seven Network)
23 July –  Dynomutt, Dog Wonder (Nine Network)
8 August –  Gather Your Dreams (ABC)
10 August/24 November –  Salvage 1 (10 August: Nine Network - Melbourne, 24 November: Nine Network - Sydney)
3 September –  1990 (ABC)
21 September –  Supertrain (Nine Network)
2 October –  Hazell (ABC)
2 October –  Diff'rent Strokes (Nine Network)
3 October –  Angie (Nine Network)
11 October –  Circus (ABC)
15 October –  Yogi's Space Race (Nine Network)
19 October –  Out of Bounds (ABC)
7 November –  A Special Sesame Street Christmas (Seven Network)
18 November –  Bless Me, Father (Seven Network)
19 November –  WKRP in Cincinnati (Nine Network)
19 November –  SCTV (The 0-10 Network)
19 November –  The Big Blue Marble (Nine Network)
21 November –  Brothers and Sisters (Seven Network)
21 November –  Joe & Valerie (Seven Network)
22 November –  Return of the Saint (Seven Network)
24 November –  David Cassidy: Man Undercover (Seven Network)
25 November –  Mixed Blessings (Seven Network)
27 November –  The Aphrodite Inheritance (ABC)
27 November –  Disraeli (Seven Network)
5 December –  Taxi (Nine Network)
11 December –  Born and Bred (ABC)
13 December –  Pennies from Heaven (ABC)
20 December –  The Roller Girls (The 0-10 Network)
24 December –  Christmas Eve on Sesame Street (ABC)

Television shows

1950s
 Mr. Squiggle and Friends (1959–1999)

1960s
 Four Corners (1961–present)

1970s
 Hey Hey It's Saturday (1971–1999, 2009–2010)
 Young Talent Time (1971–1988)
 Countdown (1974–1987)
 The Don Lane Show (1975–1983)
 This is Your Life (1975–1980)
 Chopper Squad (1976–1979)
 In the Wild (1976–1981)
 Glenview High (1977–1979)
 60 Minutes (1979–present)
 Prisoner (1979–1986)
 Doctor Down Under (1979–1980)

Ending this year

See also
 1979 in Australia
 List of Australian films of 1979

References